Bryn Fôn (born 27 August 1954) is a Welsh actor and singer-songwriter. He also became the first ever artist to play live on BBC Radio Cymru in 1977.

Biography 
Bryn Fôn was born in Llanllyfni, Caernarfonshire. He attended Ysgol Gynradd Llanllyfni and Ysgol Dyffryn Nantlle before going on to study physical exercise and environmental studies at college. He began his career in entertainment by taking part in the opera Dic Penderyn in 1977. He formed the musical group Crysbas after leaving college, and Sobin a'r Smaeliaid in 1988. He was voted the hunk of the month in She magazine during the 1980s.

He began releasing albums with his band under his own name in 1994. He and his band later performed under the name Bryn Fôn a'r Band, releasing music under their own label . He won the song contest Cân i Gymru in 1997, with Un Funud Fach.

In his later career, Fôn has concentrated on appearing on stage and also adapted the play Blackbird for a production by Theatr Bara Caws in which he starred in 2010. At present, he performs with his own band. He is involved with numerous gigs yearly all over Wales, most particularly the Royal Welsh Show and the National Eisteddfod of Wales.

Personal life 
A campaign of protest linked to the Welsh language movement began in December 1979, which involved burning down English-owned holiday homes in Wales. Fôn wrote a song belittling the police's unsuccessful attempts to catch those responsible. In 1990, several detectives visited his home and he was arrested along with his partner, Anna, after they discovered a package hidden in a wall on his cottage's land. He was held at the police station in Dolgellau for 48 hours before being released without charge. His C'mon Midffild! co-cast member, Mei Jones, was arrested at the same time.

In January 2011, it was announced that Bryn Fôn was one of a hundred people who had refused to pay their TV licences as part of the Cymdeithas yr Iaith Gymraeg protests against plans to cut the budget of the Welsh-language TV channel, S4C, and the plans to transfer control over the channel to the BBC.

Fôn is also politically active in support of the Welsh language, and is a supporter of Welsh independence.

Fôn is married with two children.

Discography

Albums

Filmography

References

External links
 website

1954 births
20th-century Welsh male singers
Welsh-language singers
Welsh male television actors
Welsh male stage actors
Welsh-speaking actors
Welsh language activists
People from Caernarfonshire
Living people
21st-century Welsh male singers
21st-century Welsh male actors
20th-century Welsh male actors